Tungsten carbide (chemical formula: WC) is a chemical compound (specifically, a carbide) containing equal parts of tungsten and carbon atoms. In its most basic form, tungsten carbide is a fine gray powder, but it can be pressed and formed into shapes through sintering for use in industrial machinery, cutting tools, chisels, abrasives, armor-piercing shells and jewelry.

Tungsten carbide is approximately twice as stiff as steel, with a Young's modulus of approximately 530–700 GPa, and is double the density of steel—nearly the same as gold. It is comparable with corundum (α-) in hardness and can be polished and finished only with abrasives of superior hardness such as cubic boron nitride and diamond powder, wheels and compounds.

Naming
Historically referred to as Wolfram, Wolf Rahm, wolframite ore was then later carburized and cemented with a binder creating a composite now called "tungsten carbide". Tungsten is Swedish for "heavy stone".

Colloquially among workers in various industries (such as machining), tungsten carbide is often simply called carbide.

Synthesis

WC can also be produced by heating WO3 with graphite: directly at 900 °C or in hydrogen at 670 °C following by carburization in argon at 1,000 °C. Chemical vapor deposition methods that have been investigated include:
reacting tungsten hexachloride with hydrogen (as a reducing agent) and methane (as the source of carbon) at 
 +  +  → WC + 6HCl
reacting tungsten hexafluoride with hydrogen (as reducing agent) and methanol (as source of carbon) at 
 + 2 +  → WC + 6HF +

Chemical properties
There are two well-characterized compounds of tungsten and carbon, WC and tungsten semicarbide, . Both compounds may be present in coatings and the proportions can depend on the coating method.

Another meta-stable compound of tungsten and carbon can be created by heating the WC phase to high temperatures using plasma, then quenching in inert gas (plasma spheroidization). This process causes macrocrystalline WC particles to spheroidize and results in the non-stoichiometric high temperature phase  existing in a meta-stable form at room temperature. The fine microstructure of this phase provides high hardness (2800-3500 HV) combined with good toughness when compared with other tungsten carbide compounds. The meta-stable nature of this compound results in reduced high temperature stability.

At high temperatures WC decomposes to tungsten and carbon and this can occur during high-temperature thermal spray, e.g., in high velocity oxygen fuel (HVOF) and high energy plasma (HEP) methods.

It is resistant to acids and is only attacked by hydrofluoric acid/nitric acid (HF/) mixtures above room temperature. It reacts with fluorine gas at room temperature and chlorine above  and is unreactive to dry  up to its melting point. Finely powdered WC oxidizes readily in hydrogen peroxide aqueous solutions. At high temperatures and pressures it reacts with aqueous sodium carbonate forming sodium tungstate, a procedure used for recovery of scrap cemented carbide due to its selectivity.

Physical properties

Tungsten carbide is extremely hard, ranking about 9 to 9.5 on the Mohs scale, and with a Vickers number of around 2600. It has a Young's modulus of approximately 530–700 GPa, a bulk modulus of 630–655 GPa, and a shear modulus of 274 GPa. It has an ultimate tensile strength of 344 MPa, an ultimate compression strength of about 2.7 GPa and a Poisson's ratio of 0.31.

The speed of a longitudinal wave (the speed of sound) through a thin rod of tungsten carbide is 6220 m/s.

Tungsten carbide's low electrical resistivity of about 0.2 µΩ·m is comparable with that of some metals (e.g. vanadium 0.2 µΩ·m).

WC is readily wetted by both molten nickel and cobalt. Investigation of the phase diagram of the W-C-Co system shows that WC and Co form a pseudo binary eutectic. The phase diagram also shows that there are so-called η-carbides with composition  that can be formed and the brittleness of these phases makes control of the carbon content in WC-Co cemented carbides important. In the presence of a molten phase such as cobalt, abnormal grain growth is known to occur in the sintering of tungsten carbide, with this having significant effects on the performance of the product material.

Structure

There are two forms of WC, a hexagonal form, α-WC (hP2, space group Pm2, No. 187), and a cubic high-temperature form, β-WC, which has the rock salt structure. The hexagonal form can be visualized as made up of a simple hexagonal lattice of metal atoms of layers lying directly over one another (i.e. not close packed), with carbon atoms filling half the interstices giving both tungsten and carbon a regular trigonal prismatic, 6 coordination. From the unit cell dimensions the following bond lengths can be determined: the distance between the tungsten atoms in a hexagonally packed layer is 291 pm, the shortest distance between tungsten atoms in adjoining layers is 284 pm, and the tungsten carbon bond length is 220 pm.

Applications

Cutting tools for machining

Sintered tungsten carbide–cobalt cutting tools are very abrasion resistant and can also withstand higher temperatures than standard high-speed steel (HSS) tools. Carbide cutting surfaces are often used for machining tough materials such as carbon steel or stainless steel, and in applications where steel tools would wear quickly, such as high-quantity and high-precision production. Because carbide tools maintain a sharp cutting edge better than steel tools, they generally produce a better finish on parts, and their temperature resistance allows faster machining. The material is usually called cemented carbide, solid carbide, hardmetal or tungsten-carbide cobalt. It is a metal matrix composite, where tungsten carbide particles are the aggregate, and metallic cobalt serves as the matrix. It has been found wear and oxidation properties of cemented carbide can be improved by replacing cobalt with Iron Aluminide.

Ammunition
Tungsten carbide, in its monolithic sintered form, or much more often in cemented tungsten carbide cobalt composite (see above), is often used in armor-piercing ammunition, especially where depleted uranium is not available or is politically unacceptable.  projectiles were first used by German Luftwaffe tank-hunter squadrons in World War II. However, owing to the limited German reserves of tungsten,  material was reserved for making machine tools and small numbers of projectiles. It is an effective penetrator due to its combination of great hardness and very high density.

Tungsten carbide ammunition is now generally of the sabot type. SLAP, or saboted light armour penetrator, where a plastic sabot discards at the barrel muzzle, is one of the primary types of saboted small arms ammunition. Non-discarding jackets, regardless of the jacket material, are not perceived as sabots but as bullets. Both of the designs are, however, common in designated light armor-piercing small arms ammunition. Discarding sabots such as are used with M1A1 Abrams main gun are more commonplace in precision high-velocity gun ammunition.

Mining and foundation drilling

Tungsten carbide is used extensively in mining in top hammer rock drill bits, downhole hammers, roller-cutters, long wall plough chisels, long wall shearer picks, raiseboring reamers, and tunnel boring machines. In these applications it is also used for wear and corrosion resistant components in inlet control for well screens, sub-assemblies, seal rings and bushings common in oil and gas drilling. It is generally utilised as a button insert, mounted in a surrounding matrix of steel that forms the substance of the bit. As the tungsten carbide button is worn away the softer steel matrix containing it is also worn away, exposing yet more button insert.

Nuclear

Tungsten carbide is also an effective neutron reflector and as such was used during early investigations into nuclear chain reactions, particularly for weapons. A criticality accident occurred at Los Alamos National Laboratory on 21 August 1945 when Harry Daghlian accidentally dropped a tungsten carbide brick onto a plutonium sphere, known as the demon core, causing the subcritical mass to go supercritical with the reflected neutrons.

Sports usage

Trekking poles, used by many hikers for balance and to reduce pressure on leg joints, generally use carbide tips in order to gain traction when placed on hard surfaces (like rock); carbide tips last much longer than other types of tip.

While ski pole tips are generally not made of carbide, since they do not need to be especially hard even to break through layers of ice, rollerski tips usually are. Roller skiing emulates cross country skiing and is used by many skiers to train during warm weather months.

Sharpened carbide tipped spikes (known as studs) can be inserted into the drive tracks of snowmobiles. These studs enhance traction on icy surfaces. Longer v-shaped segments fit into grooved rods called wear rods under each snowmobile ski. The relatively sharp carbide edges enhance steering on harder icy surfaces. The carbide tips and segments reduce wear encountered when the snowmobile must cross roads and other abrasive surfaces.

Car, motorcycle and bicycle tires with tungsten carbide studs provide better traction on ice. They are generally preferred to steel studs because of their superior resistance to wear.

Tungsten carbide may be used in farriery, the shoeing of horses, to improve traction on slippery surfaces such as roads or ice. Carbide-tipped hoof nails may be used to attach the shoes; in the United States, borium – chips of tungsten carbide in a matrix of softer metal such as bronze or mild steel – may be welded to small areas of the underside of the shoe before fitting.

Surgical instruments & medical
Tungsten carbide is also used for making surgical instruments meant for open surgery (scissors, forceps, hemostats, blade-handles, etc.) and laparoscopic surgery (graspers, scissors/cutter, needle holder, cautery, etc.). They are much costlier than their stainless-steel counterparts and require delicate handling, but give better performance.

Jewelry

Tungsten carbide, typically in the form of a cemented carbide (carbide particles brazed together by metal), has become a popular material in the bridal jewelry industry due to its extreme hardness and high resistance to scratching. Even with high-impact resistance, this extreme hardness also means that it can occasionally be shattered under certain circumstances. Some consider this useful, since an impact would shatter a tungsten ring, quickly removing it, where precious metals would bend flat and require cutting.  Tungsten carbide is roughly 10 times harder than 18k gold. In addition to its design and high polish, part of its attraction to consumers is its technical nature. Special tools, such as locking pliers, may be required if such a ring must be removed quickly (e.g. due to medical emergency following a hand injury accompanied by swelling).

Other

Tungsten carbide is widely used to make the rotating ball in the tips of ballpoint pens that disperse ink during writing.

Tungsten carbide is a common material used in the manufacture of gauge blocks, used as a system for producing precision lengths in dimensional metrology.

English guitarist Martin Simpson is known to use a custom-made tungsten carbide guitar slide. The hardness, weight, and density of the slide give it superior sustain and volume compared to standard glass, steel, ceramic, or brass slides.

Tungsten carbide has been investigated for its potential use as a catalyst and it has been found to resemble platinum in its catalysis of the production of water from hydrogen and oxygen at room temperature, the reduction of tungsten trioxide by hydrogen in the presence of water, and the isomerisation of 2,2-dimethylpropane to 2-methylbutane. It has been proposed as a replacement for the iridium catalyst in hydrazine-powered satellite thrusters.

A tungsten carbide coating has been utilized on brake discs in high performance automotive applications to improve performance, increase service intervals and reduce brake dust.

Toxicity
The primary health risks associated with tungsten carbide relate to inhalation of dust, leading to silicosis-like pulmonary fibrosis. Cobalt-cemented tungsten carbide is also anticipated to be a human carcinogen by the American National Toxicology Program.

3D Printing
A new technology to produce Tungsten Carbide is 3D printing. 
You can create a complex new form with 3D printing. Also, a created add value is the faster lead time for mining companies or oil platforms.

References

Cited sources

External links

International Chemical Safety Card 1320
NIOSH Pocket Guide to Chemical Hazards

Carbides
Superhard materials
Tungsten compounds
Rock salt crystal structure